Ricardo Jorge Guerreiro Felisberto (born 8 October 1983 in Almodôvar, Beja District), known as Katchana, is a Portuguese footballer who played as a midfielder.

References

1983 births
Living people
People from Almodôvar
Portuguese footballers
Association football midfielders
Liga Portugal 2 players
Segunda Divisão players
S.C. Beira-Mar players
FC Pampilhosa players
C.D. Mafra players
APOP Kinyras FC players
Ayia Napa FC players
Enosis Neon Paralimni FC players
R.D. Águeda players
Anadia F.C. players
Cypriot First Division players
Cypriot Second Division players
Portuguese expatriate footballers
Expatriate footballers in Cyprus
Portuguese expatriate sportspeople in Cyprus
Sportspeople from Beja District